Bull is a surname.

In addition to people bearing "Bull" as an Old World-derived surname, "Bull" has been part of the names of some Native Americans. Some of them bear it as part of a traditional name of their respective cultures. Some of these, and some others, either have borne it as part of a legal surname or (with or without their assent) been treated as bearing it.

Those bearing Bull as a surname include:
 Alfred E. Bull (1867–1930), American football player and coach
 Amos Bull (1744–1825), one of America's first composers
 Amos Bad Heart Bull (c. 1868 – 1913), Oglala Lakota artist, son of Bad Heart Bull, passed that whole name on to both his sons in surname fashion
 Amy Bull (1877–1953), British suffragist and rural district councillor
 Anders Henrik Bull (1875 – after 1909), Norwegian electrical engineer
 Anders Sandøe Ørsted Bull (1817–1907), Norwegian politician and mayor of Oslo
 Andy Bull, an Australian singer-songwriter from Sydney
 Anthony Bull (1908–2004), British transport engineer and president of the Institute of Transport
 Bart Bull, American writer, reporter, author, columnist, and critic
 Bartle Bull (born 1970), American writer, magazine editor and journalist
 Ben Bull, English footballer
 Benjamin Bull (1798–1879), American lawyer and politician
 Bernt Bull (born 1946), Norwegian politician for the Labour Party
 Brynjulf Bull (1906–1993), Norwegian lawyer, Supreme Court advocate and politician
 Bull (fl. 1871), Kent cricketer with unknown given name
 Cavinder Bull, Singaporean lawyer
 Charlie Bull (1909–1939), English cricketer
 Charles Livingston Bull (1874–1932), American illustrator
 Clarence Sinclair Bull (1896–1979), American portrait photographer
 Clive Bull (born 1959), English radio talk show host
 Dan Bull (born 1986), British rapper
 David Bull (television presenter) (born 1969), British television commentator and former doctor
 David Bull (Scouting), British scouting commissioner
 Deborah Bull (born 1963), English dancer, writer, and broadcaster
 Dixie Bull (fl. 1630s), English sea captain and pirate
 Donald Bull, rugby union player who represented Australia
 Edvard Bull, several people
 Edward Bull (c.1759–1798), English steam engine engineer
 Eleanor Bull (1550–1596), owned establishment where Christopher Marlowe, the Elizabethan playwright and poet, died in 1593
 Emma Bull (born 1954), American science fiction and fantasy author
 Ephraim Wales Bull (1806–1895), American farmer and politician, inventor of the Concord grape
 Fran Bull (born 1938), American artist
 Francis Bull (1887–1974), Norwegian literary historian, professor at University of Oslo
 Frederick Bull (1875–1910), English cricketer who played for Essex
 Fredrik Rosing Bull (1882–1925), Norwegian engineer and Information technology pioneer
 Gary Bull (born 1966), an English footballer
 Geoff Bull (born 1942),  an Australian jazz trumpeter and bandleader
 Geoffrey Bull (1921–1999), a Scottish Christian missionary and author
 Georg Andreas Bull (1829–1917), Norwegian architect and chief building inspector
 Georg Jacob Bull (1785–1854), a Norwegian jurist and politician
 George Bull (1634–1710), English theologian and Bishop of St David's
 George Bull (cricketer), English cricketer of the 1900s
 Gerald Bull (1928–1990), Canadian engineer
 Graham MacGregor Bull (1918–1987), South African and British physician
 Grant Short Bull (c. 1851–1935), Lakota leader; passed Short Bull on to both his sons in surname fashion
 Harcourt Burland Bull (1824–1881), Canadian journalist and political figure
 Harold R. Bull (1893–1976), Assistant Chief of Staff, Supreme Headquarters Allied Expeditionary Force (SHAEF) under Dwight D. Eisenhower
 Hedley Bull (1932–1985), Australian-born political scientist
 Henrik Bull (1864–1953), Norwegian architect and designer
 Henrik H Bull (born 1929), a founder of Bull Stockwell Allen Architects in San Francisco
 Henrik Johan Bull, Norwegian businessman who patented the grenade-harpoon gun used for whaling
 Henry Bull (settler) (1799–1848), an early settler in the Swan River Colony, served in British Navy
 Henry Bull (governor) (1610–1694), early colonial Governor of Rhode Island
 Henry Graves Bull (1818–1885), English medical doctor, botanist, and mycologist
 Hiram C. Bull (1820–1879), American politician
 Jacob Breda Bull (1853–1930), a Norwegian author
 James J. Bull, Professor in Molecular Biology at the University of Texas at Austin
 Jan Bull (1927–1985), Norwegian author and theater instructor
 Jens Bull (1886–1956), Norwegian jurist and diplomat
 Johan Lausen Bull (1751–1817), Norwegian jurist and politician
 Johan Randulf Bull (1749–1829), Norwegian judge
 John Bull, several people
 Karl Sigwald Johannes Bull, (1860–1936), Norwegian Minister of Defence from 1910 to 1912
 Knud Bull (1811–1889), Norwegian painter and counterfeiter
 Lucien Bull (1876–1972), Irish-born French pioneer in chronophotography
 Lyder Bull (1881–1959), Norwegian civil servant
 Marie Magdalene Bull (1827–1907), Norwegian actress and photographer
 Melville Bull (1854–1909), U.S. Representative from Rhode Island
 Mike Bull (born 1946), pole vaulter and decathlete from Northern Ireland
 Moses Bull (1830–1896), American politician
 Nikki Bull (born 1981), English footballer
 Norma Bull (1906–1980), Australian artist
 Obadiah Bull, Irish lawyer during the reign of Henry VII, who coined the phrase "that's Bull"
 Olaf Bull (1883–1933), Norwegian poet
 Ole Bull (1810–1880), Norwegian violinist
 Ole Bornemann Bull (physician) (1842–1916), Norwegian ophthalmologist
 Peter Bull (1912–1984), British character actor
 René Bull (1872–1942), British illustrator and photographer
 Richard Bull, several people
 Richard Bull (actor) (born 1924), American film actor, stage actor and television actor
 Richard Bull (aviator) (1914–1942), United States Navy aviator during World War II
 Richard Bull (Australian politician) (born 1946), Australian politician
 Richard S. Bull (1913–1942), earned the Distinguished Flying Cross during World War II
 Roger Anthony Bull,  Canadian diplomat
 Ronnie Bull (footballer) (born 1980), English footballer
 Ronnie Bull (American football) (born 1940), American football running back
 Roy Bull (1929–2004), Australian rugby player and coach
 Sandy Bull (1941–2001), American folk musician
 Schak Bull (1858–1956), Norwegian architect
 Scott Bull (born 1953), American professional football player
 Silke Bull, East German sprint canoer
 Stephen Bull (1904–1942), English lawyer and baronet
 Steve Bull (born 1965), English footballer
 Storm Bull (1913–2007), American musician, composer and educator
 Sverre Hagerup Bull (1892–1976), Norwegian banker, composer and writer
 Tas Bull (1932–2003), Australian trade union leader
 Theodor Bull (1870–1958), Norwegian businessperson and genealogist
 Tom Bull (1905–1976), Australian politician
 Tove Bull (born 1945), Norwegian linguist
 Trygve Bull (1905–1999), Norwegian lecturer and politician
 Vika Bull and Linda Bull, Australian vocal duo performing as Vika and Linda
 Walter Bull (died 1952), English football player and manager
 William Bull, several specific people
 William Bull (landowner) (1867–1956), early Australian landowner in the Riverina region, Australia
 William Frederick Bull, Canadian diplomat
 William James Bull (1863–1931), 1st Baronet, British solicitor, Conservative politician, Member of Parliament

People bearing Bull as part of a traditional Native-American name 

 Sitting Bull (c. 1831 – 1890), Hunkpapa Sioux leader and performer
 Amos Bad Heart Bull (c. 1868 – 1913), Oglala Lakota artist and historian
 Grant Short Bull (c. 1851 – 1935), Oglala Lakota leader (he started being known, as an adult, with "Grant" before his traditional name, and passed "Short Bull" on in surname fashion in the male line of his descendants)
 Arnold Short Bull (c. 1845 – 1923), Sičháŋǧu (or Brulé) Lakota leader
 White Bull (Native American) (1849–1947), Sioux leader

English-language surnames